Jacob Dale Feener (born January 4, 1992) is an American soccer player who plays as a goalkeeper.

Career

College and amateur
Feener spent his entire college career at Seattle University between 2010 and 2013.

After graduating, Feener spent time with Premier Development League club Seattle Sounders FC U-23 in 2014.

Professional
Feener signed with United Soccer League club Tulsa Roughnecks on March 30, 2015.

References

External links
Seattle University coaching bio
Redhawks bio

1992 births
Living people
American soccer players
Seattle Redhawks men's soccer players
Seattle Sounders FC U-23 players
FC Tulsa players
Association football goalkeepers
Soccer players from California
USL League Two players
USL Championship players
People from Rocklin, California
Oral Roberts Golden Eagles men's soccer coaches
Seattle Redhawks men's soccer coaches